Destiny Fulfilled is the fifth and final studio album by American girl group Destiny's Child. It was released on November 8, 2004, by Columbia Records and Sony Urban Music.

Following the conclusion of promotional activities for their globally successful third studio album Survivor (2001), Destiny's Child embarked on a two-year hiatus, during which each member released solo albums to varying levels of success. They reunited in the summer of 2004 to record Destiny Fulfilled, primarily at the Sony Music Studios in New York City. Unlike the group's previous recordings, the album saw each member equally contributing to the songwriting and production, drawing inspiration from the events in their lives while being apart. Executive producing the album alongside their manager Mathew Knowles, the group further worked with frequent collaborators such as Rockwilder and Rodney Jerkins, as well as several new ones, including 9th Wonder, Sean Garrett and Rich Harrison.

Destiny Fulfilled is an R&B record composed predominantly of mid-tempo tracks. It further explores genres such as crunk, dance and hip hop in its few up-tempo tracks, while incorporating funk and gospel to a lesser extent in some of the mid-tempo ones. Lyrically a concept album, each of its tracks is a continuation of its predecessor, altogether telling a complete story tracing a woman's relationship journey. The balladry and lyrical content were met with generally mixed reviews from music critics, who nevertheless praised the equality of contributions among members and their vocal performances. Despite its mixed critical reception, the album garnered five Grammy Award nominations, including Best Contemporary R&B Album.

A highly-anticipated comeback album, Destiny Fulfilled went through several release date alterations due to a concern over Internet leaks, gradually being made available exclusively via several retailers before its day-earlier nationwide release. The street date violation resulted with a premature debut at number 19 on the US Billboard 200. The album's sales were principally unaffected by the unconventional release and it subsequently peaked at number two, selling 558,000 units within its first eight days of release. It has since gone on to be certified triple platinum by the Recording Industry Association of America (RIAA). One of the best-selling girl group albums of all time, the album has sold over seven million copies worldwide.

Destiny Fulfilled produced four singles. "Lose My Breath" and "Soldier" both peaked at number three on the US Billboard Hot 100 and achieved widespread international commercial success. "Girl" peaked only at number 23 on the US Billboard Hot 100 but was a top-ten hit in Australia, Ireland, New Zealand and the United Kingdom. Meanwhile, "Cater 2 U" fared better on the US Billboard Hot 100, peaking at number 14. Destiny's Child further promoted the album with their world tour Destiny Fulfilled... and Lovin' It (2005). During the tour's Palau Sant Jordi show in Barcelona on June 11, 2005, the group announced their disbandment; they formally disbanded following the release of the live album Live in Atlanta (2006).

Background and development 

While recording their third studio album Survivor in December 2000, Beyoncé announced that Destiny's Child would eventually embark on a hiatus which would allow each member to release a solo album, which they hoped would further increase interest in the group. The idea of solo albums emanated from the group's manager and Beyoncé's father Mathew Knowles. Kelly Rowland further explained in an interview that Destiny's Child had been present in the media for a long time and they wanted to "give the public eye a rest from DC for a minute". During that same interview, she acknowledged that the trio would reunite during the fall of 2003 to start recording a new album.

Beyoncé and Rowland each released one album, while Michelle Williams released two. While each member achieved domestic success, Beyoncé was regarded as the most successful with Dangerously in Love (2003), which enjoyed international commercial success and widespread critical acclaim. This, along with their other ongoing projects, led to speculation over the disbandment of Destiny's Child. In July 2004, amidst rumors and speculations, Rowland announced the group's return to the studio to record Destiny Fulfilled. The group claimed the reunion was destined to happen, and that their affinity for each other kept them together.

Recording and production 
Production of Destiny Fulfilled commenced during the summer of 2004, with Destiny's Child enlisting frequent collaborators such as Rockwilder and Rodney Jerkins, as well as new ones, including 9th Wonder, Sean Garrett and Rich Harrison. 9th Wonder initially met Beyoncé while she was in the recording studio as her now-husband, rapper Jay-Z recorded the song "Threat" for his album The Black Album (2003). After Jay-Z went through the CD of tracks 9th Wonder had handed to him, Beyoncé mentioned that she liked what she heard from him. Several months later, 9th Wonder received a call from Jay-Z, asking for him to give the CD to Destiny's Child. He was surprised at being contacted by the rapper about working with the group, as he confessed that he had never owned an album by them. He later traveled to Los Angeles to work with the trio for their next album. During the three-day session, he produced the songs "Girl", "Is She the Reason" and "Game Over". Garrett, who co-wrote "Lose My Breath", "Soldier", "T-Shirt", "Is She the Reason", "Girl" and "Through with Love", recalled working on the album: "There was so much magic going on in the studio. We probably recorded all the songs in about a month and every day it was a new song coming out. 'Lose My Breath' was towards the latter part of the album and that was an amazing song that we felt could not only be big on the radio but big with bands and marching bands. I was on a natural high after that."

Destiny's Child recorded Destiny Fulfilled within a three-week period, mostly at the Sony Music Studios in New York City, where all tracks except "Through with Love" were recorded. They took the role of executive producing, alongside their manager Mathew Knowles. Beyoncé, who vocally produced the songs, commented that it was important for her to make sure their voices were audible and identifiable. Taking it as one of her goals, the group decided to focus on mid-tempo songs and on few dance tracks and ballads—which they considered songs listeners cannot sing along with. Beyoncé further elaborated: "We wanted to make sure that the songs would be something that we were proud of 10 years from now, 20 years from now. We wanted it to be something that people can really feel an emotion to. Up-tempo songs can do that, but they more make you wanna dance." Jerkins, who had worked with the group on their previous studio albums and with Beyoncé for her solo debut Dangerously in Love (2003), was concerned with how he would manage the production, saying: "How is this going to work?' Cause Beyoncé, she blew up solo, so how's it going to work in a group together?". However, he stated his skepticism vanished once the recording commenced, as he saw the group's "excitement being back in the studio together", calling the process "natural".

The members stated the first week of recording Destiny Fulfilled was spent solely on conversations about the events in their lives while being apart, as they hadn't spent quality time together for an extended period. This further inspired them to record the conversations and use it as the main theme of the record. In most cases, producers would send the group a CD containing a track which would serve as the basis in the songwriting process; without the producers' supervision of which part to sing, a new direction of their style was formed, differing from their previous records. The traditional approach where each member sang one verse and chimed in the chorus was replaced; on some tracks from Destiny Fulfilled, their vocals alternated on every line of the lyrics, a technique similar to hip hop artists. Differing from Survivor, on which Beyoncé had taken an active role in writing and producing, Destiny Fulfilled saw each member contributing inputs culled from personal experiences, individual opinions and points of view independent of those from the other members. As Kelly Rowland was recently engaged during the songwriting process, her writing was further influenced by the engagement. She also cited that being apart from the group affected the lyrical themes as well: "All of us have been in three different places ... so there's a lot to talk about, a lot that's gone on, personally. I think it's important to talk about that on this new record, to put what we've been going through separately into the new record."

Following their disbandment announcement in June 2005, Destiny's Child revealed in an interview that their disbandment had already been planned during the recording of Destiny Fulfilled, adding that its title was not coincidental. During the sessions, they discussed individual aspirations and realized that remaining as a group would prevent them in pursuing those interests. They further elaborated they wanted to part ways "while they were on top — and more importantly, while they were still friends". Beyoncé had also said "the group felt it still had something to offer musically" with the album, adding: "We did this record for ourselves, not to sell a million the first week out... That doesn't mean as much to us as just the fact that three friends got back together to do another record. That was our destiny.". Rowland commented: "We were like, 'You know what, we're getting older and we want to end on a high note.' We want to give our fans a great final record". Beyoncé also commented regarding the finality of their career: "Who knows what will happen in three, five or 10 years? The main thing is that we maintain our friendship and that we do it because we want to – not because it's a good business move."

Music and lyrics 

During an interview with MTV, Beyoncé stated that the songs from Destiny Fulfilled put altogether tell a complete story and noted that each track was a subsequent continuation of its predecessor. She concluded: "[The album continues with] this whole journey of this group of women trying to find love. And truly they find it because they love themselves and find it in themselves. It's friendship, it's love, it's maturity and growth, and it's everything that we wanted it to be." Musically, Destiny's Child tried challenging themselves, as they worked with different arrangements while trying to create an original sound; to succeed in this, they were influenced by The Emotions, Jodeci and SWV mixing elements of their music. Their final product was a predominantly R&B record, which further incorporated soul, dance and hip hop. The album is mostly composed of mid-tempo tracks, following the up-tempo first two tracks; Caroline Sullivan of The Guardian felt the balladry showcased "the girliness in the trio, musically and lyrically". Eric Henderson of Slant Magazine found elements of middle of the road music in the ballads.

Destiny Fulfilled opens with the up-tempo dance track "Lose My Breath", which details a man full of empty promises to a woman. It is musically complete with military, marching-band drums, keyboard stabs, and the backing track contains various sound effects. "Soldier", featuring T.I. and Lil Wayne, contains elements of Southern hip hop and crunk. Unsatisfied and unfulfilled with the lover from "Lose My Breath", the protagonists ask for a decent "soldier", further singing about finding a gangster. After finding him, the R&B ballad "Cater 2 U" lyrically details submissively serving the man. Inspired by him, the protagonists sing about doing various things to make him happy, musically accompanied by synthesizer as the song builds a crescendo. The fourth track "T-Shirt" is complete with inorganic drum sounds, guitar and backwards loop as the trio sings about sleeping in bed with their lover's T-shirt, "craving his presence, and inhailing his scent". "Is She the Reason" is an R&B ballad noted to have a similar chord progression to works of The Beatles. It lyrically follows a protagonist competing with another woman for her lover's love and attention. The song contains a trumpet-laden sample from Melba Moore's song "I Don't Know No One Else to Turn To".

"Girl" was noted for its Motown influence and friendship-themed lyrics. It features Beyoncé and Williams concerned about the relationship Rowland is in, trying to comfort her and persuade her to leave her partner. Rowland lyrically responds to them by ending the relationship on the following track "Bad Habit", on which she solely sings lead vocals. "If", complete with strings, lyrically talks about men who don't appreciate their girlfriends until their relationship ends and they realize their mistakes. "Free" was described as a "soul classic from 1975", with critics also noting elements of 1970s funk music, as the trio speaks on being "set free" after being in a relationship in which their efforts were never reciprocated. The mid-tempo track "Through with Love" was noted for its "angry" nature as it addresses a break-up. It features an undulating piano line as the members sing with restrained vocals and later religious redemption with elements of gospel. On the closing track "Love", "capital L kicks the daylights out of the forces of fear, doubt and disappointment", as the group "thank[s] God for love". They further sing about how people "can't truly love another until [they] love God and then [themselves]", proclaiming that they have found love and are "madly in it".

Release and promotion 

Promotion of Destiny Fulfilled commenced when Destiny's Child performed "Lose My Breath" after its online release on September 9, 2004 on ABC's 2004 NFL season "Opening Kickoff" special, to break their two-year hiatus. The album's track listing was revealed on October 15. On October 25, they appeared at the Radio Music Awards in Las Vegas, performing the song with an a cappella, jazz-styled opening. The following month, they performed a medley composed of "Say My Name", "Independent Women Part I" and "Survivor" and finished with "Lose My Breath" on The Oprah Winfrey Show, where they also sat down for an interview with Oprah Winfrey. On November 8, 2004, the trio appeared on Total Request Live and performed "Lose My Breath" along with "Say My Name". They additionally appeared on the German entertainment television show Wetten, dass..? on November 13, and performed "Lose My Breath". Originally slated for November 16, Destiny Fulfilled was released a day earlier due to Columbia Records' concern over "potential for Internet leaks and 'burned' CD counterfeits" which could "lead consumers to experience inferior and incomplete versions of the album". MTV had already made it available for streaming as part of its program "The Leak" on November 8, while Trans World Entertainment began selling the album in its stores on November 12. Although the album's format was originally announced to be the then-new DualDisc, it was released on an audio-only CD; however, it was released on DualDisc on February 8, 2005. On BET's 106 & Park, Destiny's Child performed "Soldier" on November 15, 2004. They also performed the song on CBSs The Early Show on December 8. In February 2005, they gave another performance of "Soldier" on the British television show Top of the Pops. At the 2005 NBA All-Star Game on February 20, they performed both "Soldier" and "Lose My Breath". They performed the latter again at the 2005 ESPY Awards on July 13. "Cater 2 U" was performed on June 28 at the 2005 BET Awards in Los Angeles.

When the advanced release date of Destiny Fulfilled was announced, Destiny's Child confirmed the initial dates of their world tour Destiny Fulfilled... and Lovin' It, which visited Asia, Oceania, Europe and North America from April to September 2005. Promotions of the tour aired over radio stations and television channels across the United States, with the group further collaborating with McDonald's, which served as its sponsor. Outside North America, it was promoted with a CD+DVD tour edition of the album, which included music videos and live performances. The tour's set list included tracks from Destiny Fulfilled alongside Destiny's Child's previous work and each member's individual songs. Numerous costume changes occurred throughout the show; the concerts exhibited products from Beyoncé's clothing line from House of Deréon, the company she co-founded with her mother Tina Knowles. During a concert at the Palau Sant Jordi in Barcelona on June 11, Rowland announced before 16,000 spectators that Destiny's Child would disband following the end of the tour. In a statement released to MTV, the group said the tour had provided them the opportunity to depart from Destiny's Child on a "high note". They also talked about the moment when the group started their musical endeavor and their realizations of pursuing individual careers after working together for several years. Destiny's Child thanked fans for their support while not closing the chance of seeing them continue supporting each member's goals in music, film and television. The July 15 show in Atlanta was filmed for the video album Live in Atlanta, which was released on March 28, 2006. A commercial success, the video debuted atop the US Top Music Videos and was certified platinum by the Recording Industry Association of America (RIAA).

Singles 
"Lose My Breath" was released as the lead single from Destiny Fulfilled on September 9, 2004. A widespread commercial success, it peaked at number three on the US Billboard Hot 100, becoming the group's seventh consecutive top-ten single on the chart. Furthermore, it became their second Dance Club Songs number-one single. The digital single was certified platinum by the Recording Industry Association of America (RIAA) in July 2020. Internationally, the song peaked atop the European Hot 100 Singles, as well as charts in Belgium, Ireland and Switzerland, further peaking within the top ten in almost every other country. The American Broadcasting Company (ABC) used the song as the music for their introductory montage during the 2004 NBA Playoffs and through the first few weeks of the 2005 NBA Playoffs. Critically acclaimed, it was nominated for Best R&B Performance by a Duo or Group with Vocals at the 47th Annual Grammy Awards (2005). Its accompanying music video was directed by Marc Klasfeld and shows the group members involved in an alleyway dance battle against their own duplicates. At the 2005 MTV Video Music Awards, the video was nominated for Best Dance Video.

"Soldier" was released as the second single from Destiny Fulfilled on November 9, 2004. Repeating the success of its predecessor, it peaked at number three on the US Billboard Hot 100 and atop the Dance Club Songs. The digital single was certified platinum by the RIAA in July 2020. Internationally, the song peaked within the top ten in Australia, Canada, Denmark, Finland, Ireland, Italy, the Netherlands, New Zealand, Switzerland and the United Kingdom. Critically acclaimed, it was nominated for Best Rap/Sung Collaboration at the 48th Annual Grammy Awards (2006). The black and white accompanying music video for the song was directed by Ray Kay and features appearances from featured artists T.I. and Lil Wayne, Beyoncé's sister Solange, singers Lloyd and Ginuwine, and rappers Bow Wow, Ice Cube, WC and Jeezy. At the 2005 MTV Video Music Awards, the video was nominated for Best Group Video.

"Girl" was released as the third single from Destiny Fulfilled on March 15, 2005. It failed to replicate the success of its predecessors as it peaked only at number 23 on the US Billboard Hot 100, ending Destiny's Child's streak of top-ten singles on the chart. The digital single was certified gold by the RIAA in October 2005. Internationally, the song peaked within the top ten in Australia, Ireland, New Zealand and the UK. Its Sex and the City-inspired accompanying music video was directed by Bryan Barber and follows the song's lyrical theme, with Rowland ending the video by leaving her deceitful lover.

"Cater 2 U" was released as the fourth and final single from Destiny Fulfilled on June 7, 2005. A moderate commercial success, it peaked at number 14 on the US Billboard Hot 100. The digital single was certified platinum by the RIAA in July 2020. Internationally, the song failed to chart in most countries due to its digital-only release, but peaked at number seven in New Zealand. Despite causing polarity among critics due to its lyrics, the song was nominated for Grammy Awards for Best R&B Performance by a Duo or Group with Vocals and Best R&B Song in 2006. Its Jake Nava-directed accompanying music video depicts the group in various settings at the Red Rock Canyon State Park.

"Got's My Own", which originally appeared as a bonus track on the Japanese edition of Destiny Fulfilled, was released as a promotional single on May 3, 2005.

Critical reception 

Destiny Fulfilled received mixed reviews from music critics. At Metacritic, which assigns a weighted mean rating out of 100 based on reviews from mainstream critics, the album received an average score of 52 based on 17 reviews, indicating "mixed or average reviews". Dimitri Ehrlich of Vibe complimented the production, saying that it "showcases advanced production values" with "impressive" songwriting and vocal abilities, concluding that it "offers divine satisfaction". A writer for Billboard felt the album worked as "a testament to Beyoncé's evolving multiple talents". Stephen Thomas Erlewine of AllMusic praised Rowland's and Williams' abilities as vocalists and their contributions to the choruses, but felt that Beyoncé "steals every song", further commending her for sounding "larger than life even when she's quiet". However, he concluded: "as a whole, the album winds up sounding too reserved and heavy-handed, which makes it a disappointment". Andy Battaglia of The A.V. Club wrote in his review that "Destiny Fulfilled sounds distant and detached", further criticizing its mid-tempo balladry for sounding "uninterrupted at best, uninspired at worst". Kelefa Sanneh of The New York Times commented that the album is "a surprisingly perfunctory disc that never quite justifies its existence". Alan Ranta of Tiny Mix Tapes doubted Beyoncé's lyrical sincerity, saying: "the success of this album depends once again on the complete suspension of die-hard fans' disbelief that Beyoncé 'Your Ad Here' Knowles could ever actually truly love another human being as much as she loves herself and her possessions."

Caroline Sullivan of The Guardian commented that the lead vocals on Destiny Fulfilled were likely to be sung by each member equally, noting that it made the album a "democratic" one. However, she criticized Destiny's Child for squandering "the extent of their talents" on the album. Tom Sinclair of Entertainment Weekly also noticed its "overall air of democracy at work" and noted that the album "often moves at a molasses-like pace, weighted down with a preponderance of exquisitely executed but ultimately dull ballads". Jenny Eliscu of Rolling Stone echoed Sinclair's comments, saying: "In all but a couple of songs, the verses are divided into three sections, with Beyonce leading things off, followed by Rowland, then Williams". She noted that after a couple of upbeat songs, "the album slumps into an endless string of overwrought R&B ballads where the only saving grace is ... these ladies can harmonize like nobody's business." Eric Henderson of Slant Magazine commented that the album's ballads build into "the same sort of standoffish sexual supply-and-demand bartering that has marred their worst tracks". Most of the critics questioned why Beyoncé returned to Destiny's Child after achieving the most solo success among the members. Henderson lambasted Beyoncé to performing again with the group with the "full intention" of taking advantage to bolster her "divette" status to superstardom.

Accolades

Awards and nominations

|-
! scope="row"| 2005
| Soul Train Music Award
| Best R&B/Soul Album – Group, Band or Duo
| rowspan="6"| Destiny Fulfilled
| 
| 
|-
! scope="row" rowspan="3"| 2005
| Japan Gold Disc Award
| International Rock & Pop Albums of the Year
| 
| 
|-
| Soul Train Lady of Soul Award
| Best R&B/Soul Album by a Group, Band or Duo
| 
| 
|-
| Dutch MOBO Award
| Best Album
| 
| 
|-
! scope="row"| 2005
| American Music Award
| Favorite Soul/R&B Album
| 
| 
|-
! scope="row"| 2006
| Grammy Award
| Best Contemporary R&B Album
| 
| 
|}

Listings

Commercial performance 

In the United States, Destiny Fulfilled prematurely debuted at number 19 on the Billboard 200 chart dated November 27, 2004 due to a street date violation, amassing sales of 61,000 copies in a single day and registering the highest pre-street date sales in the history of Nielsen SoundScan at the time. In its first full week of sales, Destiny Fulfilled sold over 497,000 copies, with an increase of 713% compared to its early sales, ascending to number two on the Billboard 200. The same week, it reached the summit of the Top R&B/Hip-Hop Albums after prematurely debuting at number 11. The group's second number-one album on the Top R&B/Hip-Hop Albums following Survivor (2001), it spent two weeks atop the chart. On January 14, 2005, the album was certified triple platinum by the Recording Industry Association of America (RIAA). It emerged seventh on the year-end Billboard 200 and third on Top R&B/Hip-Hop Albums for 2005. By October 2009, the album had sold 3.1 million copies in the US according to Nielsen SoundScan. In Canada, the album debuted and peaked at number three on the Canadian Albums Chart, and was certified platinum by Music Canada in June 2005.

In the United Kingdom, Destiny Fulfilled debuted and peaked at number five on the UK Albums Chart on November 27, 2004; it went on to spend a total of 25 weeks charting. Additionally, the album debuted and peaked at number two on the UK R&B Albums Chart. It was certified double platinum by the British Phonographic Industry (BPI) on April 20, 2018. Across Europe, the album reached the top ten in Austria, France, Germany, Ireland, the Netherlands, Spain and Switzerland. Furthermore, it peaked at number five on the European Top 100 Albums, and was certified platinum by the International Federation of the Phonographic Industry (IFPI) in December 2004 for sales of one million copies across Europe. In Australia, the album debuted and peaked at number 11 on the ARIA Top 100 Albums, being certified platinum by the Australian Recording Industry Association (ARIA) two weeks later. In New Zealand, it debuted at number 25 and peaked at number 21 in its 13th week, being certified gold by the Recorded Music NZ (RMNZ). In Japan, the album debuted and peaked at number four on the Oricon Albums Chart, and was soon after certified platinum by the Recording Industry Association of Japan (RIAJ). According to IFPI, Destiny Fulfilled was the eighth best-selling album worldwide of 2004. One of the best-selling girl group albums of all time, it has sold over seven million copies worldwide.

Track listing 

Notes
 signifies a producer and vocal producer
 signifies a vocal producer
 signifies a co-producer
 signifies an additional vocal producer

Sample credits
 "Is She the Reason" contains excerpts from "I Don't Know No One Else to Turn To" by Melba Moore.
 "Girl" contains sampled elements from "Ocean of Thoughts and Dreams" by the Dramatics.
 "If" contains excerpts from "Inseparable" by Natalie Cole.
 "Free" contains excerpts from "Night Whistler" by Donald Byrd.
 "Game Over" contains excerpts from "Flashback" by Dee Dee Sharp.
 "What's It Gonna Be" contains replayed elements of "Do It Roger" by Roger.

Personnel
Credits are adapted from the liner notes of Destiny Fulfilled.

Noemi Bonazzi – prop stylist
Jim Caruana – recording engineer (tracks 1, 3–9, 11), engineering (2)
Candice Childress – production coordination (track 7)
Bryan Michael Cox – keyboards (track 7), drum machine (7)
Tom Coyne – mastering
Kendrick Dean – keyboards (track 7)
Vincent Dilorenzo – recording engineer (track 4)
Andre Harris – mixing
Eric Hunter – recording engineer (track 10)
Ty Hunter – stylist
Rodney Jerkins – instrumentation (tracks 1, 3)
Kimberly Kimble – hair stylist
Fabian Marasciullo – additional vocal engineering (track 2)
Mally Roncal – make-up
Ric Rude – instrumentation (track 3)
Tim "Timmy Shakes" Stewart – guitar (track 3)
Tom Tapley – additional vocal engineering (track 2)
Sam Thomas – digital editing, additional Pro-Tools editing (7)
Jeff Villanueva – recording engineer (tracks 1, 3)
Rommel Nino Villanueva – digital editing, additional Pro-Tools Editing (tracks 2, 8)

Production

Beyoncé Knowles - producer
Kelly Rowland – vocal producer
Michelle Williams – vocal producer
Sam Thomas – vocal editing
Rommel Nino Villanueva – vocal editing
Andrew Dawson –  mixing (5)
Vincent Dilorenzo – mixing (4)
Dre & Vidal – mixing (4)
Tony Maserati – mixing (tracks: 1, 3, 9, 11)
Dave Pensado – mixing (tracks: 5, 6, 8)
Phil Tan – mixing (7)
Dexter Simmons – mixing (2, 10)
Theresa LaBarbera Whites – A&R
Huy Nguyen – A&R
Alice Butts – design, art direction
Ian Cuttler – design, art direction
Fabrizio Ferri – photography

Charts

Weekly charts

Year-end charts

Decade-end charts

Certifications

Release history

See also 
 Destiny's Child discography
 List of Billboard number-one R&B/hip-hop albums of 2004
 List of Billboard number-one R&B/hip-hop albums of 2005
 List of best-selling girl group albums

Notes

References

Bibliography

External links 
 
 
 

2004 albums
Albums produced by 9th Wonder
Albums produced by Bryan-Michael Cox
Albums produced by Dre & Vidal
Albums produced by Rodney Jerkins
Albums produced by Sean Garrett
Albums produced by Rich Harrison
Albums produced by Rockwilder
Destiny's Child albums
Columbia Records albums
Sony Urban Music albums
Albums produced by Beyoncé